Worsley is a suburban area in Greater Manchester, England.

Places

Antarctica
 Cape Worsley, Graham Land
 Mount Worsley, South Georgia Island
 Worsley Icefalls, Nimrod Glacier, Antarctica

Australia 
 Worsley, Western Australia
 Worsley River (Western Australia)

Canada 
 Worsley, Alberta

United Kingdom 
 Worsley (UK Parliament constituency)
 Worsley (ward)
 Worsley and Eccles South (UK Parliament constituency)
 Worsley Building, Leeds School of Medicine

Other uses 
 Lady Worsley (disambiguation)
 Worsley (surname)
 Worsley baronets, a title in the Baronetage of England
 Worsley Works, a British manufacturer of kits for model trains

See also
 
 Worsleya, a genus of plants in the Amaryllis family